John Patrick Lionel Petre, 18th Baron Petre,  (born 4 August 1942) is a British peer and landowner who was the Lord Lieutenant of Essex, succeeding Robin Neville, 10th Baron Braybrooke in October 2002. He is the 18th Baron of the Petre family, an old recusant family.

Early life
Petre was on 4 August 1942, the only child of Joseph William Lionel Petre, 17th Baron Petre (1914–1989) and Marguerite Eileen (d. 2003), daughter of Ion Wentworth Hamilton, of Westwood, Nettlebed, Oxfordshire. His father served in World War II as a 2nd Lt. in the Coldstream Guards and as a Capt. in the 5th Battalion, Essex Regiment. His father was the eldest child and only son of Lionel Petre, 16th Baron Petre, and his wife Catherine Boscawen, and succeeded to the title Lord Petre at only fifteen months old in 1915, after his father died in the First World War.

Petre was educated at Eton and rowed for Trinity College, Oxford.

Career
Upon the death of his father on 1 January 1989, he succeeded as the 18th Baron Petre.

Petre is associated with local organizations such as Essex Boys and Girls Clubs, Brentwood Arts Council; Brentwood Shakespeare Company; Ingatestone and Fryerning Horticultural Society, Honorary Member of the Rotary Club of Ingatestone, Brentwood Theatre; Ingatestone and Fryerning Angling Club; CAB (Brentwood) Appeal Fund; Ingatestone and Fryerning Historical and Archeological Society; and patron of the Billericay based Hamelin Trust and the registered charity Grapevine Essex; Chairman of Trustees of the Ginge Petre Almshouses in Ingatestone High Street, President of Essex County Scouts, Stock and Buttsbury Heritage Society and St John Ambulance Essex.

He held the office of Deputy Lieutenant (DL) of Essex in 1991. He was appointed Commander of the Most Venerable Order of the Hospital of St. John of Jerusalem (CStJ), and was appointed Knight Commander of the Royal Victorian Order (KCVO) in the 2016 Birthday Honours.

In December 2016, it was announced that Petre would deliver a Christmas message for the people of Essex. The message was initially broadcast on Essex TV on Christmas Eve.

Personal life
On 16 September 1965, Petre was married to Marcia Gwendolyn Plumpton, the only daughter of Alfred Plumpton of Portsmouth. Together, they were the parents of three children:

 Hon. Dominic William Petre (b. 1966), who married Marisa Verna Perry, daughter of Anthony J. Perry, in 1998.
 Hon. Mark Julian Petre (1969–2004)
 Hon. Clare Helen Petre (b. 1973), who married Ibrahim Azeem, of S Feydhoo, Maldives, in 2002.

Lord Petre lives near Chelmsford. His family estate is at Ingatestone Hall, where his son and heir apparent, Dominic, and his family live.

See also
Father Edward Petre
John Petre, 1st Baron Petre

References

External links
 John Petre, 18th Baron Petre, Lord Lieutenant of Essex at Getty Images
Family of Petre
Petre Genealogy
http://thepeerage.com/p3630.htm#i36291

1942 births
Living people
People educated at Eton College
Alumni of Trinity College, Oxford
Lord-Lieutenants of Essex
British Roman Catholics
John
Place of birth missing (living people)
Knights Commander of the Royal Victorian Order
18
Petre